Erich Graff-Wang (15 October 1902 – 26 June 1969) was a Norwegian footballer. He played in two matches for the Norway national football team in 1924. He was also part of Norway's squad for the football tournament at the 1920 Summer Olympics, but he did not play in any matches.

References

External links
 

1902 births
1969 deaths
Norwegian footballers
Norway international footballers
Place of birth missing
Association football forwards